Tadeusz Ludwik Piskor (1889–1951) was a Polish Army general.

Life and career
Piskor was born on 1 February 1889 in Bór Kunowski. Before World War I, he was a member of Polish pro-independence organizations. During World War I he served in the Polish Legions, and subsequently fought in the 1919–21 Polish-Soviet War.

During the Interbellum, Piskor held various posts, including Chief of the General Staff, and Army Inspector.

During the September 1939 Campaign, he commanded the Lublin Army. His forces were defeated in the Battle of Tomaszów Lubelski by German forces, and he became a prisoner of war at Fort Srebrna Góra from 1939.

After the war, he settled in London, where he died in 1951.

Honours and awards
 Silver Cross of the Virtuti Militari (1921)
 Commander's Cross of the Order of Polonia Restituta, previously awarded the Officer's Cross
 Cross of Independence
 Cross of Valour - four times
 Gold Cross of Merit
 Commemorative Medal for War 1918-1921
 Decades Regained Independence Medal
 Officers' badge "Parasol"
 Commander's Cross of the Legion of Honour (France), previously awarded the Knight's Cross
 Commander's Cross of the Order of the Star of Romania
 Commander's Cross of the Order of the White Eagle (Kingdom of Yugoslavia)
 Commander's Cross with Swords of the Order of Leopold (Belgium)
 Cross of Liberty class III (Estonia)
 Order of the Cross of the Eagle Class I (Estonia, 1932)

See also
 Marian Rejewski, footnote citation no. 1.
 Stanley S.Seidner, Marshal Edward Śmigły-Rydz Rydz and the Defense of Poland, New York, 1978.

References

External links

1889 births
1951 deaths
People from Ostrowiec County
Polish generals
Recipients of the Legion of Honour
Polish people of World War I
Polish military personnel of World War II
Polish prisoners of war
World War II prisoners of war held by Germany
Recipients of the Silver Cross of the Virtuti Militari
Recipients of the Cross of Independence
Commanders of the Order of Polonia Restituta
Recipients of the Cross of Valour (Poland)
Recipients of the Gold Cross of Merit (Poland)
Commandeurs of the Légion d'honneur
Commanders of the Order of the Star of Romania
Recipients of the Military Order of the Cross of the Eagle, Class I